Winogradskyella profunda is a Gram-negative, aerobic, rod-shaped and non-motile bacterium from the genus of Winogradskyella which has been isolated from sediments from the bottom of the Chukchi Sea.

References

Flavobacteria
Bacteria described in 2019